Jeffrey Ryan "Duke" Roufus (born February 19, 1970) is an American former kickboxer and head coach of the Roufusport based in Milwaukee, Wisconsin, United States. He is a well-known striking coach in North America.

Career
Duke Roufus started training in martial arts at an early age. He is the younger brother of kickboxer Rick "The Jet" Roufus.

His professional kickboxing career saw him collect a number of titles. During the 1990s he won the W.K.A. North American Super Heavyweight Championship, W.A.K.O. World Super Heavyweight Championship, W.K.B.A. World Super Heavyweight Championship and the K.I.C.K. World Super Heavyweight Championship and the I.K.F. Pro Muay Thai Rules Super Heavyweight World Title on December 4, 1998 in Milwaukee Wisconsin, over Hiriwa TeRangi of New Zealand by unanimous decision 50-43 on all three judges' cards. On March 19, 1999, in Milwaukee, Wisconsin, in his only defense of his I.K.F. title, Roufus quickly defeated Australia's WKA World Champion Grant Barker with a combination of strikes which included a leg kick, 2 knees to Barker's head and finished with a high head kick. Roufus only took 39 seconds to knockout the Australian in the opening round of the scheduled 5 round Muay Thai bout. He opened Milwaukee Kickboxing & Fitness Club in June 1997.

Roufus voluntarily vacated his Super Heavyweight I.K.F. Title to move down to the Heavyweight Muay Thai Division and soon after, retired. However, at the end of October 2000, Roufus announced he would come out of retirement to fight in the K-1 USA tournament. He lost his second round bout in the May 2001 K-1 USA tournament and his opening round bout in the August, 2001 K-1 USA tournament.

On December 11, 2002, Roufus made his retirement official. His final kickboxing record was 36–8–1 and in pro boxing he was 2–0.

On two further occasions Roufus has come out of retirement to fight in the ring to record wins against Sinisa "Thunderman" Andrijasevic on June 3, 2005 and Eduardo Maiorino on May 25, 2007.

Following his retirement, he has become a well-known trainer, working with many mixed martial artists including former UFC Lightweight Champion Anthony Pettis, Alan Belcher, Pat Barry, Erik Koch, Ben Rothwell, Matt Mitrione, former U.S. Olympian and former Bellator World Champion Ben Askren and former UFC Welterweight Champion Tyron Woodley. Other former students include Kill Cliff FC coach Jason Strout, former UFC Lightweight Champion Jens Pulver, The Ultimate Fighter Season One star Stephan Bonnar and CM Punk.

Duke Roufus, business partner Scott Joffe and Anthony Pettis operate Roufusport Martial Arts Academy in Milwaukee, Wisconsin.

Roufus has also served as color commentator for K-1 on ESPN2 and has appeared on TSN in Canada, Walker Texas Ranger and Fox's Best Damn Sport's Show Period.

Roufus and Joffe also operate NAFC (North American Fighting Championship) MMA & Kickboxing, which has served as a launching pad for many current and former stars of MMA.

Honors and titles 
1998 I.K.F. World Super Heavyweight Champion
1997 K.I.C.K. World Super Heavyweight Champion
1996 W.K.B.A. World Super Heavyweight Champion 
1995 W.A.K.O. World Super Heavyweight Champion
1995 I.S.K.A. World Super Heavyweight champion
1995 W.K.A. World Super Heavyweight champion
1993 W.K.A. North American Super Heavyweight Champion 
1991 W.A.K.O. World Championships in London, UK  +84 kg (Light-Contact)

Kickboxing record (incomplete)

|-
|
|Win
| Lawson Baker
|Gladiators Fighting's 50th -"Knockout Kings"
|Milwaukee, Wisconsin, United States
|Decision (Unanimous)
|align="center"|3
|align="center"|
| 
|-
|
|Win
| Eduardo Maiorino
|Colosseum 5
|Winnipeg, Manitoba, Canada
|TKO (Leg Kicks)
|align="center"|2
|align="center"|0:56
| 
|-
|
|Win
| Sinisa Andrijasevic
|Heavyweight Gladiators
|Milwaukee, Wisconsin, United States
|Decision (Unanimous)
|align="center"|5
|align="center"|3:00
|-
|
|Loss
| Marvin Eastman
|K-1 World Grand Prix 2002 in Las Vegas
|Las Vegas, Nevada, United States
|KO (knees to the body)
|align="center"|3
|align="center"|0:19
| 
|-
|
|Win
| Pedro Fernandez
|Heavyweight Gladiators
|Milwaukee, Wisconsin, United States
|TKO (Corner Stoppage)
|align="center"|4
|align="center"|
| 
|-
|
|Loss
| Stefan Leko
|K-1 World Grand Prix 2001 in Las Vegas
|Las Vegas, Nevada, United States
|TKO
|align="center"|2
|align="center"|2:34
| 
|-
|
|Loss
| Michael McDonald
|K-1 World Grand Prix 2001 Preliminary USA
|Las Vegas, Nevada, United States
|Decision (Unanimous)
|align="center"|3
|align="center"|3:00
| 
|-
|
|Win
| Tomasz Kucharzewski
|K-1 World Grand Prix 2001 Preliminary USA
|Las Vegas, Nevada, United States
|TKO (2 knockdowns)
|align="center"|1
|align="center"|2:26
| 
|-
|
|Win
| Dewey Cooper
| 
|Milwaukee, Wisconsin, United States
|Decision (unanimous)
|align="center"|5
|align="center"|3:00
| 
|-
|
|Win
| Grant Barker
| 
|Milwaukee, Wisconsin, United States
|KO (High Kick)
|align="center"|1
|align="center"|0:39
|Defended IKF Super Heavyweight World title.
|-
|
|Win
| Hiriwa TeRangi
| 
|Milwaukee, Wisconsin, United States
|Decision (Unanimous)
|align="center"|
|align="center"|
|Won IKF Super Heavyweight World title.
|-
|
|Win
| Patrick Smith
| 
|Ledyard, Connecticut, United States
|TKO (Leg Kick)
|align="center"|2
|align="center"|
|Defended KICK Super Heavyweight World title.
|-
|
|Loss
| Mike Bernardo
|K-1 Grand Prix '96 Opening Battle
|Yokohama, Japan
|TKO
|align="center"|2
|align="center"|1:37
| 
|-
|
|Win
| Stan Longinidis
|World Cup of Martial Arts
|Ledyard, Connecticut, United States
|KO (Overhand Right Straight)
|align="center"|1
|align="center"|0:41
|Won WKA, ISKA and WAKO World Super Heavyweight titles
|-
|
|Loss
| Andy Hug
|1994 Seidokaikan Karate World Cup
| 
|KO (Kick to the Body)
|align="center"|3
|align="center"|2:17
|
|-
|
|Win
| Takeshi Tanaka
|K-1 Revenge
|Yokohama, Japan
|KO (Right Punch)
|align="center"|2
|align="center"|0:05
| 
|-
|
|Win
| Zinnie Reynolds
| 
|Milwaukee, Wisconsin, United States
|
|align="center"|
|align="center"|
|Won WKA North American Championship
|-
|-
| colspan=9 | Legend:

See also
List of male kickboxers
Kickboxing
Muay Thai

References

External links
 Roufusport.com

1970 births
Living people
American male kickboxers
Kickboxers from Wisconsin
Heavyweight kickboxers
American Muay Thai practitioners
American practitioners of Brazilian jiu-jitsu
Kickboxing trainers
Mixed martial arts trainers